The War Machine was a gaming magazine first published in 1981 by Mike W. Costello.

Contents
The War Machine was a newsletter published bimonthly in the UK focusing on the link between computers and wargames.

Reception
Bruce F. Webster reviewed The War Machine in The Space Gamer No. 46. Webster commented that "It carries a hobbyist flavor reminiscent of the early Space Gamer, though the paper and print quality are better."

References

Wargaming magazines